Stephen Wills may refer to:

Stephen Willis (footballer) (born 1986), Cook Islands footballer
Stephen Willis (musicologist) (1946–1994), Canadian musicologist